Kela or KELA may refer to:

 KelA, a sports club in Kellokoski, Finland
 KELA (AM), a radio station (1470 AM) licensed to Centralia-Chehalis, Washington, United States
 Kela (Finnish institution), the Finnish social security agency
 Kela (tribe), of West Bengal, India
 Kela, Angola, a commune in Malanje Province
 Kela, Semnan, a village in Iran
 Kela, a village in Siuntio, Swede,
 Kela language, a Bantu language spoken in the Democratic Republic of Congo
 Kela language (New Guinea), an Austronesian language spoken on New Guinea
 Kela-2 gas field, in Xinjiang, China
 KELA-FM, a radio station in McKenna, Washington, now known as KZTM
 Golden Kela Awards, for the worst performances in Hindi cinema

People with the forename Kela
 Kela Kvam (1931–2019), Danish academic and writer

People with the surname Kela
 Adrien Kela (born 1991), New Caledonian middle-distance athlete
 Anssi Kela (born 1972), Finnish musician
 Keone Kela (born 1993), American professional baseball pitcher
 Killa Kela (born Lee Potter, 1983), English musician
 Madhusudan Kela, Indian businessman

See also